Papilionanthe Miss Joaquim, also known as the Singapore orchid, the Princess Aloha orchid and formerly as Vanda Miss Joaquim, is a hybrid orchid (a grex) that is the national flower of Singapore. For its resilience and year-round blooming quality, it was chosen on 15 April 1981 to represent Singapore's uniqueness and hybrid culture.

History
Ashkhen Hovakimian (Agnes Joaquim)found  this natural hybrid orchid which bears her name in a clump of bamboo (Arditti and Hew, 2007). It was recognised as a hybrid not only by orchid expert Henry Ridley in 1893 and again in 1896, but by other contemporary orchid growers as well as orchid journals including the Orchid Review. Sander's Complete List of Orchid Hybrids, which distinguished between natural and artificial hybrids, listed Vanda Miss Joaquim as an artificial hybrid. Vanda Miss Joaquim is a cross between the Burmese Vanda teres (now called Papilionanthe teres) and the Malayan Vanda hookeriana (now called Papilionanthe hookeriana). It was not known which of the two species produced the seeds and which one provided the pollen. The hybrid was shown to Henry Ridley, the director of the Singapore Botanic Gardens. Ridley examined it, had it sketched and sent a description to the Gardeners' Chronicle writing that: "A few years ago Miss Joaquim, a lady residing in Singapore, well known for her success as a horticulturist, succeeded in crossing Vanda hookeriana Rchb. f., and V. teres, two plants cultivated in almost every garden in Singapore."

On 15 April 1981, Singapore Minister for Culture S. Dhanabalan proclaimed the species to be Singapore's national flower.

DNA sequences from maternally inherited chloroplast DNA have been used to determine that the pod parent was P. teres var. andersonii and, by exclusion, the pollen parent is P. hookeriana.

In 2016, National Parks Board and National Heritage Board officially acknowledged Joaquim created the orchid.

The scientific name as of 2019 is Papilionanthe Miss Joaquim, as both parent species are now placed in the genus Papilionanthe.

This orchid is also the first registered plant hybrid from Singapore.

Features
It is a free flowering plant and each inflorescence can bear up to 12 buds, and usually 4 flower blossom at a time. Each flower measures 5 cm across and 6 cm tall. The petals are twisted such that the back surface faces the front like its parents. The two petals on the top and the top sepal are rosy-violet, while the 2 lateral sepals on the lower half are pale mauve. The large and board lip of the orchid which looks like a fan is colored violet-rose, and merges into a contrasting fiery orange that are finely spotted with dark purple center. 

Papilionanthe 'Miss Joaquim' is a robust sun loving plant that requires heavy fertilizing, vertical support to enable it to grow straight and tall along with free air movement and high humidity. It starts blossoming after its stem rises 40 to 50 cm above the support.

References

Arditti, J., and C. S. Hew. 2007. The origin of Vanda Miss Jaoquim. Pages 261–309 in K. M. Cameron, J. Arditti and T. Kull (eds.), Orchid Biology, Reviews and Perspectives, Vol. IX, The New York Botanical Garden Press, New York.
Johnson H. and N. Wright, 2008 Vanda Miss Joaquim: Singapore's National Flower and the Legacy of Agnes and Ridley, Suntree Media Pte Ltd, Singapore. 

Wright N. H. 2000. The Origins of Vanda Miss Joaquim. Malayan Orchid Review  34; 70–73.
Wright N. H. 2003 Respected Citizens: the History of Armenians in Singapore and Malaysia, Amassia Publishing, Middle Park, Australia.
Wright N. H. 2004. After a re-examination of the origins of Vanda Miss Joaquim. Orchid Review 112: 292–2988.
Yam,  T. W. 1999. A possible solution to the parentage riddle

External links

 National Parks Board
 National Library Board

Miss Joaquim
Orchid cultivars
Interspecific orchid hybrids
Orchids of Singapore
National symbols of Singapore